Rosa Luxemburg (1871–1919) was a Polish-Jewish-German Marxist theorist, socialist philosopher, and revolutionary. 

Rosa Luxemburg can also refer to:

 Rosa Luxemburg (film), a 1986 film based on her life
 Rosa-Luxemburg-Platz, a square in Berlin-Mitte, Germany
 Rosa Luxemburg Foundation, a German research foundation
 Rosa-Luxemburg-Straße (Berlin), a street in Berlin
 Rosa-Luxemburg-Straße (Frankfurt am Main), a major road in Frankfurt am Main
 Rosa-Luxemburg-Platz (Berlin U-Bahn), a Berlin U-Bahn station